Mogzon may refer to:
Mogzon, Khiloksky District, Zabaykalsky Krai, an urban-type settlement in Khiloksky District of Zabaykalsky Krai, Russia
Mogzon, Krasnochikoysky District, Zabaykalsky Krai, a village (selo) in Krasnochikoysky District of Zabaykalsky Krai, Russia